Blachernae was a suburb in the northwestern section of Constantinople, the capital city of the Byzantine Empire. It is the site of a water source and a number of prominent churches were built there, most notably the great Church of St. Mary of Blachernae (Panagia Blacherniotissa), built by Empress Pulcheria in c. 450, expanded by Emperor Leo I (r. 457–474) and renovated by Emperor Justinian I (r. 527–565) in the 6th century.

Etymology
The Romanian philologist Ilie Gherghel wrote a study about Blachernae and concluded that it possibly derived from the name of a Vlach (sometimes written as Blach or Blasi), who came to Constantinople from the lower Danube, a region named today Dobruja. Gherghel compared data from old historians like Genesios and from the Greek lexicon Suidas and mentioned the existence of a small colony of Vlachs in the area of today Blachernae. Similar opinions were sustained by Lisseanu. The name Blachernae appeared in a work of Theophanes the Confessor in connection with a revolt of Flavius Vitalianus against Emperor Anastasius I in 513.

According to Ilie Gherghel, the word vlach became known in the Germanic and Slavic world through the Vikings that came in contact with the Byzantine Empire. The byzantine origin of the word vlach is supported by the historian Stelian Brezeanu who considers that one of the first accounts about Romanians south of the Danube, referred to by the name vlachorynchini (the vlachs near the Rynchos river), is present in a historical account about the Kastamonitou Monastery which was written in the 17th century but based on a 9th century byzantine source.

Byzantine era
The quarter is recorded as regio XIV in the early 5th-century Notitia Urbis Constantinopolitanae, where it is recorded as being enclosed by a wall of its own. The quarter was connected to the city proper at the construction of the Theodosian Walls, but the Church of St. Mary remained outside of the walls until 627, when Emperor Heraclius (r. 610–641) built another wall to enclose it. By that time, the church had become the major Marian shrine of the city, and the second-most important church in Constantinople after Hagia Sophia, if only because the emperors' residence was nearby. In 1347, Emperor John VI Kantakouzenos (r. 1347–1354) was crowned there, instead of at Hagia Sophia.

South of the church and situated on the city's Seventh Hill stood the imperial Palace of Blachernae, which was first erected in c. 500. During the Komnenian period, it became the favourite imperial residence, eclipsing the older Great Palace of Constantinople on the eastern end of the city. Although the Latin emperors returned to the Bucoleon Palace, the Palaiologos emperors of the restored Byzantine Empire again used the Blachernae Palace as their main residence. The Palace of the Porphyrogenitus and the so-called Prison of Anemas are the main surviving structures of the Palace of Blachernae, which was a complex of multiple buildings.

Following the fall of Constantinople to the Ottomans in May 1453, the Sultan's residence was moved to Topkapı Palace on the site of the ancient acropolis of Byzantium, opposite to the original site of the Great Palace, which had by this time fallen into complete ruin, and the Blachernae area (with the exception of the Palace of Porphyrogenitus) fell into disuse.

During the Byzantine Papacy, the portion of the Aventine overlooking the Greek quarter of Rome became known as the ad Balcernas or Blachernas.

Today
The historic Blachernae area is in the present-day Istanbul quarter known as Ayvansaray. The sacred spring, associated with the Virgin Mary, can still be visited today; in Turkish it is named Ayazma, a name derived from the Greek term hagiasma, meaning "holy water".

Gallery

See also
Atik Mustafa Pasha Mosque
Blachernitissa
Blanquerna
The Protection of the Mother of God

References

Sources

Further reading

External links
I. Gherghel on etymology 
Church of Panagia of Blachernae
3D Reconstruction of the Blachernae Walls at the Byzantium 1200 Project

Quarters and suburbs of Constantinople
Populated places in ancient Thrace
Former populated places in Turkey